Phoenicus or Phoinikous, or Phoenicus Portus or Limne Phoinikous (λιμὴν Φοινικοῦς),  was a harbour town of ancient Cythera.

Its site is located near the modern Kapsali.

References

Populated places in ancient Ionian Islands
Former populated places in Greece
Kythira

Phoenician colonies in Greece